Mira Markström (born January 30, 2005) is a Swedish ice hockey defenceman and member of the Swedish national under-18 ice hockey team, currently playing on a junior contract with HV71 Dam of the Swedish Women's Hockey League (SDHL). She also plays floorball with Jönköpings IK.

Playing career 
Markström began playing ice hockey at the age of four, and played on boys' teams in her home town of Jönköping until she was 15. She made her SDHL debut with HV71 in the 2019–20 season, picking up three assists in 20 games. She added another assist in six playoff games as the club made it to the championship finals against Luleå HF/MSSK before the season was cancelled due to the COVID-19 pandemic in Sweden. In 2019, she scored the first goal in the first-ever girls TV-pucken tournament.

It only took her 11 games to surpass her rookie production in her second season, having scored 4 points in the first 11 games of the 2020–21 SDHL season, including her first professional goal.

International play 
A an ice hockey player, she represented Sweden at the 2020 IIHF World Women's U18 Championship, picking up one assist in five games as Sweden finished in fifth. She also represented Sweden at the 2022 IIHF World Women's U18 Championship.

As a floorball player, she represented Team Sweden U19 during a Euro Floorball Tour comeptition in Uppsala in late October 2022.

References

External links

2005 births
Living people
Sportspeople from Jönköping
Swedish women's ice hockey defencemen
Swedish floorball players
HV71 Dam players
21st-century Swedish women